This is a list of the States of India ranked in order of percentage of households 
having a television set. On March 13, 2012, the Ministry of Home Affairs of the government of India released comprehensive data under "Houselisting and Housing Census" which was collected as part of the Decennial Census exercise conducted in 2011. The Census of India 2001 results have also been provided for comparison. Delhi has the highest percentage of TV ownership amongst union territories with 88 percent and Tamil Nadu has the highest TV ownership amongst states with 87 percent. Dadra and Nagar Haveli have the lowest percentage of TV ownership amongst union territories with 47 percent and Bihar has the lowest TV ownership amongst states with 14.5 percent.

Between 2001 and 2011, percentage of Indian household owning a television set increased from 31.6% (in 2001) to 47.2% (in 2011).

List

References

 www.measuredhs.com/publications/publication-frind3-dhs-final-reports.cfm

Ownership